A. spicata may refer to:

 Actaea spicata, the baneberry, Eurasian baneberry or herb Christopher, a flowering plant species native to Europe
 Amelanchier spicata, the thicket shadbush, low juneberry, dwarf serviceberry or low serviceberry, a plant species
 Anredera spicata, J. F. Gmelin, a species in the genus Anredera
 Artemisia spicata, a species in the genus Artemisia and ingredient found in Génépi 
 Asterogyne spicata, a flowering plant species found only in Venezuela
 Austrotaxus spicata, the New Caledonia yew or southern yew, a plant species

See also
 Spicata (disambiguation)